Accrington and Rossendale College is a further education college based in Accrington, Lancashire, England.

The College 
Accrington & Rossendale College ('Accross') is a further education college that specialises in vocational education.

The college offers qualifications ranging from entry-level to honours degrees to the residents of Hyndburn, Rossendale, the Ribble Valley and beyond. In 2018, the college was awarded an OFSTED grade of 'Good' in every measure aside from Apprenticeships. In November 2018, Accrington and Rossendale College merged with Nelson and Colne College incorporating Lancashire Adult Learning.

The New Campus

The Coppice Centre
In 2007, 'Accross' launched its new £16 million Broad Oak Campus, which includes the new Coppice Centre, which houses TV, radio, dance and recording studios, 120-seat theatre and desktop publishing suite.

The college also moved its Hair & Beauty departments to the Broad Oak Campus and now operates the “Seasons Salon” which comprises 4 hair salons and 3 beauty salons. It is also home to the 'Accross' Travel Office.

The Refectory is also located in the Coppice Centre, along with The Hub, the new student common room, complete with table football, magazines and Nintendo Wii.

The Hameldon Building
The Hameldon building houses the College's Construction and Motor Engineering workshops, along with several classrooms and meeting rooms.

The Motor Engineering department is made up of the Carl Fogarty Technology Centre and the Motorcycle Workshop.

The Construction Department has art workshops for different trade areas. These include:  Painting & Decorating, Carpentry & Joinery, Brickwork, Plumbing, Gas, Floor Covering, and Plastering.

The Broad Oak Centre
The largest and the oldest of our campus buildings, the four story Broad Oak Centre is host to a number of curriculum departments and facilities.

The Higher Education office, Information+; shop, cash machine, computer rooms and classrooms make up a large part of the building, but a special mention should be reserved for the College's Library+

In addition to the well stocked bookshelves in The Library+, there are also extensive computer access, internet access, quiet study area, DVDs, CDs, magazines, journals and newspapers.  There are also photocopying and scanning facilities.

The college's main reception is on the ground floor of the Broad Oak Centre, and the top floor consists of the College's Innovation Centre, set up to provide local and regional businesses with training, conference and meeting facilities.  It comprises a Conference Room, Innovation Room and Lecture Theatre.

Notable former students 

Carl Fogarty – Five time world Superbike Champion
Phil Neville – Former Man Utd Premiership winner and current Everton captain
Gary Neville – Man Utd Premiership, FA Cup, European Cup winner and England International
Jeanette Winterson – Author of Oranges Are Not the Only Fruit, Winner of the Whitbread Prize for a first novel and recipient of an OBE in the 2006 honours list

See also
Allonby v Accrington and Rossendale College

References

External links 
 

Accrington
Further education colleges in Lancashire
Buildings and structures in Hyndburn
Education in Hyndburn